Rastoropovo is a rural locality (a village) in Nikolskoye Rural Settlement, Ustyuzhensky District, Vologda Oblast, Russia. The population was 275 as of 2002. There are 11 streets.

Geography 
Dubrova is the nearest rural locality.

References 

Rural localities in Ustyuzhensky District